Carmen Meininger (born 11 March 1969) is a German sport shooter who competed in the 2000 Summer Olympics.

References

1969 births
Living people
German female sport shooters
ISSF pistol shooters
Olympic shooters of Germany
Shooters at the 2000 Summer Olympics
Place of birth missing (living people)